is a former Japanese football player.

Club career
Enomoto was born in Nerima, Tokyo on 16 March 1979. After graduating from high school, he joined Yokohama Marinos (later Yokohama F. Marinos) in 1997. He became a regular goalkeeper in October 2001, when Japan national team goalkeeper Yoshikatsu Kawaguchi moved to England. Shortly thereafter, 2001 J.League Cup Final on 27 October, he made three saves in the penalty shootout, and the club won the champions. He was also elected MVP award. The club won the champions 2003 and 2004 J1 League. However his opportunity to play decreased behind Tetsuya Enomoto from 2005. He moved to Vissel Kobe in 2007. He played as regular goalkeeper. His opportunity to play decreased behind Kenta Tokushige in 2010 and moved to J2 League club Tokushima Vortis in 2011. However he could hardly play in the match behind Oh Seung-hoon and he moved to Tochigi SC in 2013. In 2015, he moved to FC Tokyo. Although he came back J1 League, he could hardly play in the match and retired end of 2016 season.

National team career
In April 1999, Enomoto was selected Japan U-20 national team for 1999 World Youth Championship and Japan won the 2nd place. But he did not play in the match, as he was the team's reserve goalkeeper behind Yuta Minami.

Club statistics

Honors and awards
 World Youth Championship runner-up: 1999

References

External links

1979 births
Living people
Association football people from Tokyo
Japanese footballers
J1 League players
J2 League players
J3 League players
Yokohama F. Marinos players
Vissel Kobe players
Tokushima Vortis players
Tochigi SC players
FC Tokyo players
FC Tokyo U-23 players
Footballers at the 1998 Asian Games
Association football goalkeepers
Asian Games competitors for Japan